Waco is a 1966 American Technicolor Western film directed by R. G. Springsteen and starring Howard Keel, Jane Russell, Brian Donlevy, Wendell Corey, Terry Moore, John Smith, and Jeff Richards.

Plot
Emporia, Wyoming is a lawless town in need of a new sheriff. Preacher Sam Stone and businessman George Gates suggest that Mayor Ned West release gunfighter Waco from jail to take up the job.  At first, the mayor rejects Gates' suggestion, but when his daughter is assaulted, West decides it is time to pardon Waco.

Waco rides into town and immediately cleans it up, defying political boss Joe Gore by becoming sheriff, firing the deputy and bringing in old partner Ace Ross to be by his side. Preacher Stone's wife Jill, who used to be involved with Waco before meeting her current husband, leaves town for fear of incurring Waco's wrath. Also unhappy is rancher Ma Jenner, whose sons Ike and Pete seek revenge on her behalf for Waco's murder of their brother. Waco is outnumbered, particularly after Ace abandons him, but the mayor and preacher come to his aid. Gore and the Jenners die in the final battle, but so does Preacher Stone, which means Jill and Waco can be together again.

Cast
Howard Keel as Waco
Jane Russell as Jill Stone
Brian Donlevy as Ace Ross
Wendell Corey as Preacher Sam Stone
Terry Moore as Dolly
John Smith as Joe Gore
John Agar as George Gates
Gene Evans as Deputy Sheriff Jim O'Neill
Richard Arlen as Sheriff Billy Kelly
Ben Cooper as Scotty Moore
Tracy Olsen as Patricia West
DeForest Kelley as Bill Rile
Anne Seymour as Ma Jenner
Robert Lowery as Mayor Ned West
Willard Parker as Pete Jenner
Jeff Richards as Kallen
 Regis Parton as Ike Jenner (as Reg Parton)
Fuzzy Knight as Telegraph Operator 
Russ McCubbin as Drover
Don White as Townsman
 King Johnson as Townsman
 Barbara Latell as Townswoman
 Boyd 'Red' Morgan as Kallen's Gunslinger

References

External links

1966 Western (genre) films
1966 films
American Western (genre) films
Films directed by R. G. Springsteen
Films scored by Jimmie Haskell
Paramount Pictures films
1960s English-language films
1960s American films